Marula may refer to:

 Sclerocarya birrea, a tree native to Africa
 Marula oil, extracted from the fruits of Sclerocarya birrea
 Marula, Zimbabwe, a village in Matabeleland South Province
 Marula mine, an open pit mine in South Africa
 Marula (poet) (fl. 13th century or earlier), Sanskrit poet from India